Elias Carl Strokirk (15 September 1814 – 13 June 1887) was a Swedish ironmaster and cavalry master.

Life and work 
Elias Carl Strokirk was born on September 15, 1814, at Ölsboda, and member of the Strokirk family. His parents were Jeppe and Hedvig Magdalena Strokirk (née Broms).

In 1841, Strokirk acquired the Ölsboda Works and the Öfre Degernäs Works. In addition, Strokrik served as director of Christinehamns Enskilda Bank. Strokirk was appointed knight of the Order of the Sword.

In 1844, Elias Carl Strokirk married Ulrika Charlotta Emerentia Hammarhjelm.

References 

1814 births
1887 deaths
Swedish landowners
Swedish ironmasters
Swedish nobility
Elias Carl
Swedish people of German descent
19th-century Swedish businesspeople
19th-century Swedish military personnel
Knights of the Order of the Sword
Burials at Nysund Cemetery